Provincial Trunk Highway 42 (PTH 42) is a short provincial highway in the southwest region of the Canadian province of Manitoba. It runs from PTH 16 in the town of Shoal Lake to PTH 41 just east of the French-speaking village of St. Lazare.

PTH 42 provides a direct east-west connection through Birtle from PTH 16. As a result, the stretch between Birtle and Shoal Lake is heavily used by trucks as a direct access. The speed limit is 100 km/h (60 mph) east of Birtle and 90 km/h (55 mph) between PTH 83 and St. Lazare.

History 
The highway first appeared on the 1956 Manitoba Highway Map as PTH 41A.

The section of the route between Shoal Lake and Birtle was originally part of PTH 16, which was then known as Highway 4. When the current section of PTH 16 was opened to traffic in 1958, the highway was extended to Shoal Lake.

The highway was redesignated as PTH 42 in 1968.

References

042